The West Michigan Mayhem is a women's professional American football team based in Kalamazoo, Michigan. They play in the Women's Football Alliance. The Mayhem played in the National Women's Football Association from their inception in 2002 until 2008 (from 2002 to 2005 they were based in Otsego and known as the Southwest Michigan Jaguars). Home games are played at Roy Davis Field in Schoolcraft, Michigan.

Season-By-Season 

|-
| colspan="6" align="center" | Southwest Michigan Jaguars (NWFA)
|-
|2002 || 3 || 5 || 0 || 3rd Great Lakes Division || --
|-
|2003 || 4 || 4 || 0 || 3rd Great Lakes Division || --
|-
|2004 || 6 || 2 || 0 || 2nd North Great Lakes || Won Northern Conference Quarterfinal (Philadelphia)Lost Northern Conference Semifinal (D.C.)
|-
|2005 || 7 || 1 || 0 || 4th North Division || Won Northern Conference Quarterfinal (Columbus)Lost Northern Conference Semifinal (Detroit)
|-
| colspan="6" align="center" | West Michigan Mayhem (NWFA)
|-
|2006 || 7 || 1 || 0 || 1st North West || Lost NWFA First Round (Columbus)
|-
|2007 || 6 || 2 || 0 || 1st North West || Won Northern Conference Quarterfinal (Baltimore)Lost Northern Conference Semifinal (Pittsburgh)
|-
|2008 || 8 || 0 || 0 || 1st North North || First-round bye for Northern Conference QuarterfinalWon Northern Conference Semifinal (New York)Won Northern Conference Championship (Philadelphia)Lost NWFA Championship (H-Town) 
|-
| colspan="6" align="center" | West Michigan Mayhem (WFA)
|-
|2009 || 8 || 0 || 0 || 1st National Central || Won National Conference Semifinal (Columbus)Won National Conference Championship (Philadelphia)Lost WFA National Championship (St. Louis)
|-
|2010 || 7 || 1 || 0 || 1st National North Central || Lost National Conference Quarterfinal (Philadelphia)
|-
|2011 || 3 || 5 || 0 || 3rd National Central || --
|-
|2012 || 4 || 4 || 0 || 3rd WFA National 6 || --
|-
|2013 || 4 || 5 || 0 || 1st round of Playoffs || --
|-
|2014 || 2 || 6 || 0 || 2nd round of Playoffs || --
|-
|2015 || 6 || 2 || 0 || 1st round of Playoffs || --
|-
!Totals || 83 || 48 || 0
|colspan="2"| (including playoffs)

* = current standing

2009

Season Schedule

2010

Season Schedule

2011

Standings

Season Schedule

2012

Season schedule

External links
West Michigan Mayhem

National Women's Football Association teams
Women's Football Alliance teams
American football teams in Michigan
Sports in Kalamazoo, Michigan
American football teams established in 2002
2002 establishments in Michigan
Women's sports in Michigan